SNIA or Snia may refer to:

 Storage Networking Industry Association, a trade organization focusing on computer storage
 SNIA S.p.A., a former Italian manufacturing firm
 Snia Milano, an athletics club